= Oasis Mountain =

Mountain in Nevada, United States

Coordinates: 37.0483695°N 116.7531061°W

Oasis Mountain is a summit in the U.S. state of Nevada. The elevation is 4,728 feet (1,441 m).

Oasis Mountain was so named for its greenish color, when viewed from afar.
